Saksino is a rural locality (a village) in Kovarditskoye Rural Settlement, Muromsky District, Vladimir Oblast, Russia. The population was 199 as of 2010. There are 8 streets.

Geography 
Saksino is located 15 km northwest of Murom (the district's administrative centre) by road. Stepankovo is the nearest rural locality.

References 

Rural localities in Muromsky District
Muromsky Uyezd